Rodolfo González (born 16 December 1945) is a Mexican former professional boxer who competed from 1959 to 1974. He held the WBC lightweight title from 1972 to 1974.

Professional career
González started his career very young at the age of 14, and won his first 37 bouts.  On November 10, 1972, he took on Chango Carmona for the WBC Lightweight Title and won via a Corner retirement in the 13th round.  González defended the title two times before losing the belt to Guts Ishimatsu on April 11, 1974, via KO in the 8 round.  Later in the year he rematched Ishimatsu, but lost via TKO and retired from boxing.  González was a devastating puncher and was named to Ring Magazine's list of 100 greatest punchers, and had a career record of 81-7-1 with 71 ko's.

González actually missed making it into the World Boxing Hall of Fame by one vote in 2003, of the 140 voting members. A private vote was then taken by the 10-member Executive Committee, and González was accepted by an 8-2 vote. Two members resigned in protest, and later that year many more Executive Committee members had dropped out.

See also
 List of WBC world champions
 List of Mexican boxing world champions

References

External links
 
 article on Gonzalez at Cyber Boxing Zone
   A young Gato Gonzalez
   October 2003 Boxing Hall of Fame Induction

1945 births
Living people
Boxers from Jalisco
Sportspeople from Guadalajara, Jalisco
World boxing champions
Mexican male boxers
Lightweight boxers